= Shonqar =

Bashkir magazine

- Frequency: Monthly
- Founded: 1994
- Country: Russia
- Based in: Ufa

Shonqar (Bashkir: Шоңҡар, "Gerfalcon") is a Bashkir language monthly youth culture and entertainment magazine that has been published in Ufa since January 1994.

== History and profile ==
A concept of a general interest managazine for younger Bashkirs was first framed in 1990, when a team of journalists and editors started working within the editorial board of Agidel, the Bashkir-language literary magazine and publishing their materials in the parent magazine. In 1993, the first issue of Shonqar was published in the form of an almanach. Starting from January 1994, the magazine started to be published as a stand-alone monthly periodical. Within a matter of months, it won a wide popularity among teens all across Bashkortostan and in other regions of Russia.

To date, the magazine has become an important youth forum on Bashkir traditional culture, nurturing Bashkirt ethnic consciousness and publishing prominent regional public figures, including Ravil Bikbayev, Yihat Soltanov, Rashit Soltangaraev.

Its circulation in 2010 was 5000. Its current editor-in-chief is Azamat Yuldashbayev.
